Giorgio Lazzari (1564–1615) was a Roman Catholic prelate who served as Bishop of Minori (1604–1615).

Biography
Giorgio Lazzari was born in Tarvisan in 1564 and ordained a priest in the Order of Preachers. On 19 July 1604, he was appointed during the papacy of Pope Clement VIII as Bishop of Minori. On 8 August 1604, he was consecrated bishop by Girolamo Bernerio, Cardinal-Bishop of Albano, with Agostino Quinzio, Bishop of Korčula, and Diodato Gentile, Bishop of Caserta, serving as co-consecrators. He served as Bishop of Minori until his death in 1615.

References

External links and additional sources
 (for Chronology of Bishops) 
 (for Chronology of Bishops) 

17th-century Italian Roman Catholic bishops
Bishops appointed by Pope Clement VIII
1564 births
1615 deaths
Dominican bishops